Adaran (also Romanized as Ādarān and Āderān) is a village in Emamzadeh Abu Taleb Rural District of the Central District of Robat Karim County, Tehran province, Iran. At the 2006 National Census, its population was 2,562 in 664 households. The following census in 2011 counted 2,556 people in 701 households. The latest census in 2016 showed a population of 2,322 people in 676 households; it was the largest village in its rural district.

References 

Robat Karim County

Populated places in Tehran Province

Populated places in Robat Karim County